Sally Rose Eastall (born 5 January 1963) is an English former long-distance runner. She competed in the marathon at the 1992 Barcelona Olympics and at the 1991 World Championships in Tokyo. She ran her best time for the marathon of 2:29:29 when winning the 1991 California International Marathon.

Career
Born in Stowmarket, Suffolk, Eastall finished 11th at the 1991 World Championships in Tokyo. Three months later she ran her best-ever marathon time of 2:29:29 when winning the California International Marathon on 8  December 1991, to become only the eighth British woman to run a marathon in less than 2:30 (after Joyce Smith, Priscilla Welch, Sarah Rowell, Sally-Ann Hales, Veronique Marot, Paula Fudge and Liz McColgan). She went on to finish 13th at the 1992 Olympic Games.

She represented England in the marathon, at the 1994 Commonwealth Games in Victoria, British Columbia, Canada.

As of 2018, Eastall ranks 18th on the UK all-time list for the marathon.

Eastall is a vegan.

International competitions
All results regarding the Marathon

References

External links
 Profile at www.sports-reference.com

1963 births
Living people
People from Stowmarket
British female marathon runners
English female marathon runners
British female long-distance runners
English female long-distance runners
Olympic athletes of Great Britain
Athletes (track and field) at the 1992 Summer Olympics
World Athletics Championships athletes for Great Britain
Athletes (track and field) at the 1994 Commonwealth Games
Commonwealth Games competitors for England